Vincent Le Dauphin (born 28 June 1976 in Saint-Brieuc) is a retired French athlete who specialised in the 3000 metres steeplechase. He finished tenth at the 2004 Summer Olympics.

Competition record

Personal bests
Outdoor
1500 metres – 3:44.79 (1997)
3000 metres – 8:11.33 (La Roche-sur-Yon 2002)
5000 metres – 14:12.41 (Reims 2002)
3000 metres steeplechase – 8:15.76 (Saint-Denis 1999)
Indoor
1500 metres – 3:44.05 (Ghent 2005)
3000 metres – 7:51.91 (Stuttgart 2006)

References

1976 births
Living people
French male steeplechase runners
French male long-distance runners
Olympic athletes of France
Athletes (track and field) at the 2004 Summer Olympics
Sportspeople from Saint-Brieuc
World Athletics Championships athletes for France
21st-century French people